

League table

The regular season started 30 October 2009 and ended 19 February 2010.

Standings as of 15 February 2011

Teams 1–8 qualified to the playoffs, teams 9–10 qualified to the 2010-11 Elitserien, teams 11–12 played the second placed teams of each Allsvenskan to qualify to next season and teams 13–14 was relegated to Allsvenskan

Knock-out stage

The quarter and semi finals started 23 February and ended 16 March. The final was played 21 March 2010.

Final

Relegation play-offs

Season statistics

Top scorers

References 

Elitserien (bandy) seasons
Bandy
Bandy
Elitserien
Elitserien